Legionella adelaidensis is a Gram-negative, non-spore-forming, aerobic bacterium from the genus Legionella which was isolated from cooling tower water in Adelaide in South Australia.

References

External links
Type strain of Legionella adelaidensis at BacDive -  the Bacterial Diversity Metadatabase

Legionellales
Bacteria described in 1991